The 2002–03 Omani League was the 27th edition of the top football league in Oman. Al-Oruba SC were the defending champions, having won the previous 2001–02 Omani League season. Dhofar S.C.S.C. emerged as the champions of the 2002–03 Omani League with a total of 65 points.

Teams
This season the league had increased from 10 to 14 teams. There was no relegation in the 2001–02 season. Second Division League teams Ruwi Club, Saham SC, Al-Salam SC and Nizwa Club were promoted to this season.

Stadia and locations

League table

Top level Omani football league seasons
1
Oman